Joseph Cantafio (born April 6, 1952) is an American retired college basketball coach. Cantafio spent a total of eleven seasons as a head coach, with the Virginia Military Institute (1986–1994) and Furman University (1994–1997). A graduate of the University of Scranton, Cantafio is vice president of The Blewitt Foundation, an organization that supports military families, as well as an assistant director at the Center for Sports Leadershipfor for Virginia Commonwealth University. He is also a member of the Pennsylvania Sports Hall of Fame.

Early life
Cantafio was born on April 6, 1952 in Dunmore, Pennsylvania, and attended Dunmore High School. He attended college at the nearby University of Scranton and graduated in 1974 with a BS in history. Cantafio played on the school's basketball team for three years and was captain of the team as a senior. He also lettered in baseball and received an NCAA Postgraduate Scholarship from Scranton.

Coaching career
Cantafio began coaching immediately following his graduation from Scranton, joining Cardinal Gibbons High School in Raleigh, North Carolina in 1974. He led the Crusaders for four seasons in which he posted a 91–25 record at the school. Cantafio then spent one year with Abington Heights High School in his home state of Pennsylvania.

Following a 13–15 campaign at Abington Heights, Cantafio then joined DeMatha Catholic High School as an assistant where he served under legendary Morgan Wootten (who has the second most wins as a head coach in the history of basketball on any level and is a member of the Naismith Basketball Hall of Fame). In his three years under Wootten at DeMatha Catholic, the Stags went 83–9.

In 1982, Cantafio left for an assistant coaching job at the Virginia Military Institute where he worked under his predecessor Marty Fletcher for four seasons. Following Fletcher's departure, Cantafio assumed the position of head coach and led the Keydets for eight years. He never earned a winning season at VMI, though he did lead the 1987–88 team to the Southern Conference tournament finals. Cantafio resigned following the 1993–94 season and became the head coach of the Furman Paladins, a Southern Conference foe of VMI.

Cantafio was unable to gain success with Furman as he led the Paladins to a 30–47 record in three years. He announced in February 1997 that he would resign at the end of that season. He noted that he was tired of coaching, and said that, "As I was watching, it just dawned on me. There's a lot more to life than basketball." Cantafio also stated that he was unable to relax while coaching, and that some Furman boosters and alumni were not happy with the team's progress.

Personal life
Following the end of his coaching career, Cantafio became involved with Virginia Commonwealth University, and was hired as an assistant director to VCU's SportsCenter, which helps students seeking a career in athletics. He is also the Head of Programs for The Blewitt Foundation, which seeks to comfort and assist military families, particularly children. Cantafio earned a master's degree in Sports Leadership from VCU in 2001.

Cantafio is married to his wife, Della, and the couple has two children: a daughter, Carissa, and a son, Joey. Joey is currently the Director of Basketball Operations at Lamar University. He played basketball for Virginia Military Institute from 2007–09 before transferring to and graduating from Hampden–Sydney College in 2011.

Head coaching record

References

1952 births
Living people
Basketball coaches from Pennsylvania
Basketball players from Pennsylvania
College men's basketball head coaches in the United States
Furman Paladins men's basketball coaches
High school basketball coaches in North Carolina
Scranton Royals baseball players
Scranton Royals men's basketball players
VMI Keydets basketball coaches
American men's basketball players
High school basketball coaches in Pennsylvania